H&D, was a South Korean duo formed by Pocketdol Studio in 2020. The duo debuted on April 21, 2020, with Soulmate.

Members
Lee Han-gyul (이한결)
Nam Do-hyon (남도현)

History

Pre-debut
Prior to their debut as a duo, both members had participated as contestants on multiple shows. Hangyul had previously debuted as a member of Yama and Hotchicks Entertainment's ballad group IM and in 2017 and 2018, competed in the show The Unit alongside his members. The group is considered to be disbanded as they've been inactive since. Dohyon previously competed in the show Under Nineteen in 2018 and 2019.

Later in 2019, both Hangyul and Dohyon competed in Produce X 101, representing MBK Entertainment, alongside fellow MBK trainee Kim Yeongsang. In the show's finale, Hangyul and Dohyon placed 7th and 8th respectively, making them part of the show's debut line-up and members of the group X1. They promoted with the group until their disbandment on January 6, 2020.

After X1's disbandment, the two held a fan meeting titled "Happy Day" on February 2, 2020.

2020: Debut

On April 21, the duo debuted with their first extended play Soulmate with two title tracks, "Soul" and "Goodnight", both of which they performed during their promotion period.

On September 2, it was announced that the duo will be making a comeback on September 23 with the special album Umbrella, including the title track of the same name. The album includes songs composed by Dohyon. This album is their last album before the duo stopped working as both Hangyul and Dohyon are set to debut in Pocketdol Studio's new boy group BAE173.

Discography

Extended plays

Special albums

Singles

Awards and nominations

References

K-pop music groups
MBK Entertainment artists
South Korean boy bands
South Korean dance music groups
Musical groups from Seoul
Musical groups established in 2020
2020 establishments in South Korea
2020 disestablishments in South Korea
South Korean pop music groups
Male musical duos
South Korean musical duos